This article lists nations, groups or tribes, as well as notable individuals, who have converted to Judaism. This article does not differentiate between the different branches of Judaism. See also Who is a Jew? on issues related to the acceptance of conversions throughout the Jewish community.

A number of prominent celebrities, such as Madonna, Demi Moore, and Ariana Grande have become followers of a "new age" version of Kabbalah (see Kabbalah Centre), derived from the body of Jewish mystical teaching also called Kabbalah, but do not consider themselves – and are not considered – Jewish.

Converted nations, groups or tribes

Converted nations, groups or tribes from Christianity 
 Abayudaya
 Bnei Menashe
 Bene Ephraim, claim to be Jews who converted to Christianity, then converted back to Judaism
 B'nai Moshe (Inca Jews)
 Falash Mura
 San Nicandro Jews
 Subbotniks
 Veracruz Jews

Other converted nations, groups or tribes 
 Idumeans (disputed), Edom, 2nd century BCE, conquered and converted by John Hyrcanus
 According to rabbinic tradition, Obadiah the prophet, from a Mideastern religion
 Ituraeans, Lebanon and Syria, 2nd century BCE, conquered and converted by Aristobulus I 
 Adiabene, northern Iraq, 1st century
 Helena, queen of Adiabene, from traditional Greek religion
 Izates bar Monobaz, king of Adiabene, from a Persian or Mideastern religion
 Symacho, wife of Izates bar Monobaz, from a Persian or Mideastern religion
 Monobaz II, king of Adiabene, from a Persian or Mideastern religion
 Nabataeans, according to popular historian Paul Johnson, many were forcefully converted by the Hasmonean king Alexander Jannaeus
 Khazars (disputed), a semi-nomadic Turkic people from Central Asia (historical Khazaria), many of whom converted to Judaism en masse in the 8th and 9th centuries CE from a Khazar religion
 Bulan, king of the Khazars, from a traditional Khazar religion
 Samaw'al ibn 'Adiya and his clan
 Himyarite Kingdom, Yemen, 6th century
 Tub'a Abu Kariba As'ad, from Arabian religion, Himyarite king of Yemen; ruled Yemen 390–420 CE
 Dhu Nuwas, king of Yemen, from a Mideastern religion
 Kingdom of Semien, Ethiopia, 4th century
 Multiple Berber tribes noted by Ibn Khaldun, including the Jarawa, and possibly the warrior queen Kahina and her tribe. northwest Africa, 7th century, disputed
 Banu Qurayza and Banu Nadir, Arab Tribes who converted to Judaism when Jews arrived in Hijaz after Second Jewish-Roman Wars, Arab tribes were interested in Judaism which was brought by Jews. Later, they adopted and claimed to be Israelites. They were Arabian origins still believed sons of god concept from indigenous polytheistic beliefs.

Converted individuals

From Christianity

Former Christian clergy or theologians 
 Robert de Reddinge (converted c.1275)
 Abba Sabra, fifteenth-century Ethiopian Orthodox monk who joined the Beta Israel (Ethiopian Jewish) community. He converted his pupil, prince Abba Saga, to Judaism and introduced monasticism to Ethiopian Jewry. 
 Nicolas Antoine, former Protestant theologian.
 William G. Dever, Biblical archaeologist and former Evangelical minister who became a world-renowned Old Testament scholar and converted to Reform Judaism, although he says he no longer believes in God.
 Géza Vermes, world-renowned historical Jesus research scholar, Hebraist and historian of religion, best known for being an eminent translator of the Dead Sea Scrolls; a former Roman Catholic priest of Jewish descent, he rediscovered his Jewish roots, abandoned Christianity and converted to Liberal Judaism.
 Ahuva Gray, former Protestant minister.
 Asher Wade, former Methodist minister.
 Ole Brunell, converted with his family to Orthodox Judaism, moved to Israel and changed his name to Shlomo Brunell, former Lutheran minister.

Other Christians who converted to Judaism 

 Abba Saga, Ethiopian prince and son of emperor Zara Yaqob, who persecuted Jews. He converted with his teacher Abba Sabra, a former Ethiopian Orthodox monk. 
 Abraham ben Abraham, convert from the Potocki family, the famed "Ger Tzedek"
 Abraham of Augsburg
 John Adler, American politician
 Aluizio Abranches, Brazilian filmmaker
 Anouk Aimée, French actress
 Amar'e Stoudemire, American and Israeli basketball player
 Aquila of Sinope, Bible translator
 Art Aragon, Mexican-American boxer
 Curtis Armstrong, American actor
 Tom Arnold, American actor
 Rafael Cansinos Assens, Spanish poet, essayist, literary critic and translator
 Moses ben Avraham Avinu
 Carroll Baker, American actress
 Anne Beatts, American comedy writer
 Antonia Bennett, American singer
 Polly Bergen, American actress and singer
 Nissim Black, rapper
 Darrell Blocker, "The Spy Whisperer," CIA agent, converted to conservative Judaism in 2017.
 Dany Boon, French comedian
 Elizabeth Brewster, Canadian poet
 May Britt, actress
Geraldine Brooks, Pulitzer Prize-winning Australian-American journalist and author
 Campbell Brown, American television news reporter (Baptist Roman Catholic)
 Ken Burgess, British musician
 Anne Buydens, German-American producer, wife of Kirk Douglas
 Yisrael Campbell, comedian (lapsed Roman Catholic)
 Kate Capshaw, actress (ex-Methodist)
 Nell Carter, singer and actress
 Marvin Casey, Israeli-American hip hop dancer, choreographer, dance instructor and actor
 Cristian Castro, Grammy Award-nominated Mexican pop singer
 Mr. Catra, Brazilian funk singer and actor
 Elizabeth Jane Caulfield, linguist and musician
 Catherine Coulson, actress
 Warder Cresson, politician
 Jim Croce, singer/songwriter
 William Holmes Crosby Jr., physician, considered one of the founders of modern hematology
 Sammy Davis Jr., entertainer
 Zooey Deschanel, actress, singer, entrepreneur
 Natalie Dessay, French soprano
 Jacqueline du Pré, cellist
 Stephen J. Dubner, American journalist, author, and podcast host
 Patricia Duff, political activist and United States Democratic Party fundraiser
 Miss Elizabeth, also known as Elizabeth Ann Hulette, U.S. professional wrestling manager
 Hank Eng, Chinese-American politician
 Carlos Escudé, Argentine political scientist and author
 Rachel Factor, American Orthodox Jewish singer, actress, and dancer
 Nachman Fahrner, contemporary Jewish singer
 Louis Ferrante, American mobster
 Kate Fischer, Australian-American former model and actress
 Ada Fisher, American physician and political candidate
 Isla Fisher, model and actress (ex-Methodist)
 Mike Flanagan, Irish-Israeli soldier
 Luke Ford, journalist
 Maureen Forrester, Canadian opera singer
 Erin Foster, American writer, performer and entrepreneur
 Paula Fredriksen, former Catholic, historian of religion
 Aaron Freeman, journalist and comedian (lapsed Roman Catholic)
 Maja Ruth Frenkel, Croatian entrepreneur
 Capers Funnye (ex-Methodist), rabbi
 Steve Furness, American football player
 Natan Gamedze, former Protestant, linguist and a Swazi royal, now a black Haredi rabbi
 Scott Glenn, American actor
 Albert Goldsmid, British officer, Founder of the Jewish Lads' Brigade and the Maccabaeans
 Lord George Gordon, nobleman and politician
 Reuben Greenberg, police chief of Charleston, South Carolina
 Lars Gustafsson, Swedish professor of philosophy at the University of Texas
 Daryl Hall, American musician
 Mary Hart (born 1950), American television personality, long-time host of the entertainment program Entertainment Tonight
 Morris Hatalsky, American professional golfer
 Anthony Heald, American actor
 Henry Hill, American mobster
 Carolivia Herron, writer of children's and adult literature
 Monica Horan, actress
 Joel Horlen, American baseball player
 James Newton Howard, composer, conductor, and record producer
 Martha Hyer, actress
 Jenna Jameson, adult entertainer and entrepreneur
 Carolyn Jones, actress
 Thomas Jones (lapsed Roman Catholic)
 Y-Love a/k/a Yitz Jordan, musician
 Jon Juaristi, Spanish writer
 Skip Jutze, American major league baseball player
 Semei Kakungulu
 Walter Kaufmann, German-American philosopher, translator and poet
 Carol Kaye, American musician
 Felicity Kendal, British actress
 Cameron Kerry, politician, brother of John Kerry (lapsed Roman Catholic)
 Jamaica Kincaid, author
John King, American television journalist (lapsed Roman Catholic)
Karlie Kloss, model
 Fumiko Kometani, Japanese author and painter
 Mathilde Krim, Ph.D., founding Chairman of amfAR, association for AIDS research
 Anthony Lake, American diplomat, political figure, and academic
 Frida Laski, British suffragist, birth control advocate, and eugenicist
 Nahida Lazarus, German author, essayist, scholar, and literary critic
 Natasha Leggero, American actress and comedian
 John Lehr, American film and television actor and comedian
 Julius Lester, son of a Methodist minister and a children's author (ex-Methodist)
 Joan Lunden, American journalist, author and television host
 Ernst von Manstein, army officer and teacher
 Elliott Maddox, American former Major League Baseball player
 Richard Marceau, Canadian politician
 Sam McCullum (born 1952), NFL football wide receiver
 Charles McDew (1938–2018), African-American activist of the Civil Rights Movement.
 Anne Meara (1929–2015), American comedian and actress, partner and wife of Jerry Stiller (lapsed Roman Catholic)
 Adah Isaacs Menken, stage actress
 LaVon Mercer (born 1959), American-Israeli basketball player
 Anastassia Michaeli, Russian-born former member of the Israeli Knesset
 Benjamin Millepied, French dancer and choreographer
 Marilyn Monroe, actress (ex-Christian)
 Santa Montefiore, novelist
 Tommy Mottola, American record producer
 Françoise Mouly, French artist, designer, and art editor of The New Yorker
 Jeff Newman, American Major League Baseball catcher
 Bob Nystrom, Canadian former NHL player
 Arieh O'Sullivan, American-born Israeli journalist
 Eleanor Parker, American actress
 Lorna Patterson, American film, stage and television actress
 Annamie Paul, leader of the Green Party of Canada, converted to Conservative Judaism in 2000. She was the first Black Canadian and first Jewish woman to be elected leader of a federal party in Canada.
 Andrew Percy, British politician
 Alison Pick, Canadian novelist and poet
 Rebecca Pidgeon, Scottish-American actress, singer and songwriter
 Bob Plager, Canadian retired professional NHL ice hockey defenceman
 Moses Prado, professor of the classic languages at the University of Marburg
 Roger Rees, actor
 Reuel Abraham, German pilot in Hitler's army, then became a Jew and citizen of Israel
 Mandy Rice-Davies, British model and showgirl
 Michael Ross, Canadian intelligence expert, former Mossad officer
 Mary Doria Russell, American author (lapsed Roman Catholic)
 Jackie Sandler, American actress
 Bärbel Schäfer, German television presenter and talk show host
 Mary Schaps, Israeli-American mathematical scholar
 Laura Schlessinger, American radio personality
 Norma Shearer, American actress
 Joseph J. Sherman, businessman
 Cate Shortland, Australian director
 Shyne, Belizean–American rapper
 Karol Sidon, Czech Orthodox rabbi, writer and playwright
 Daniel Silva, American author of thriller and espionage novels
 Chris Smith, American-Israeli basketball player
 Willie "the Lion" Smith, American pianist and composer
 Robin Spark, Scottish artist.
 June Squibb, American actress
 Dubrovin Stanislav
 Kim Stanley, American actress
 Venetia Stanley, socialite
 Joseph Abraham Steblicki (lapsed Roman Catholic)
 Margo Stilley, American film actress
 Annette Taddeo, businesswoman and politician
 Elizabeth Taylor, actress (ex-Christian Scientist)
 Karen Tintori, American author of fiction and nonfiction (lapsed Roman Catholic)
 Andre Bernard Tippett, American Hall of Fame former football linebacker for the New England Patriots (ex-Baptist)
 Jacob Tirado (ca. 1540–1620), co-founder of the Sephardic community of Amsterdam
 Ivanka Trump, businesswoman, former first-daughter, raised Presbyterian
 Bob Tufts (1955-2019), American former Major League Baseball pitcher
 Ike Turner, American musician, bandleader, talent scout, and record producer; son of a Baptist minister
 Jeff Tweedy, American musician
 Michael W. Twitty, American writer, culinary historian and educator
 Alex Tyus, American-Israeli professional basketball player 
 Chris Van Allsburg, children's writer
 Conrad Veidt, German actor
 Jackie Wilson, American soul singer
 Mare Winningham, actress, singer (lapsed Roman Catholic)
 Katarzyna Weiglowa, Polish martyr
 Steve Yeager, American baseball player
 Nikki Ziering, model

Not from Christianity

From atheism and/or agnosticism 
 Christian B. Anfinsen – Nobel prize-winning chemist (Orthodox Judaism)
 David P. Goldman, "Spengler" – columnist and former member of the LaRouche movement who embraced Judaism in the 1990s
 Will Herberg – social philosopher and sociologist of religion; Jewish theologian; former atheist and Marxist of Jewish ancestry who was raised atheist
 Benny Lévy – philosopher; last personal secretary of Jean-Paul Sartre
 Suzy Menkes – fashion journalist
 Hilary Putnam – philosopher raised in a Jewish-atheist home
 Mary Doria Russell
 Anna Silk – Canadian actress
 Mare Winningham – actress
 David Wolpe – a leading rabbi in Conservative Judaism; former atheist

From Black Hebrew Israelitism 
Eddie Butler – Israeli singer, converted to Orthodox Judaism
Capers Funnye

From Islam 
 Avraham Sinai – Lebanese member of Hezbollah who had an Orthodox conversion and lives as a Haredi Jew in Tsfat.
 Ayman Subah (now known as Dor Shachar) – Palestinian Arab from Khan Yunis, Gaza who fled to Israel and converted to Judaism. 
 Baruch Mizrahi – Palestinian Arab and member of the Irgun.
 Dario Hunter – American lawyer, rabbi and politician.
 Ibrahim Shaheen and Inshirah Moussa – Palestinian man and his Egyptian wife.
 Ibtisam Hamid (popularly known as Basma al-Kuwaiti) – Kuwaiti singer and actress.
 Lucy Aharish – Arab-Israeli news anchor, reporter, television host and actress.
 Michaela DePrince – Sierra Leonean-American ballet dancer.
 Nasreen Qadri – Arab Israeli singer.
 Nissim Baruch Black (born Damian Jamohl Black) – American rapper and music producer, raised Muslim but converted to Christianity before converting to Judaism.

From other Middle Eastern religions 
 Avtalyon, Sage and vice-president of the Sanhedrin, apparently from a Mideastern religion
 Sh'maya, Sage and President of the Sanhedrin, apparently from a Mideastern religion

From Greco-Roman religion 
 Aquila of Sinope (Acylas), from traditional Greek religion
 Paulina Beturia, from traditional Roman religion
 Flavia Domitilla, from traditional ancient Roman religion (possibly to Jewish Christianity, as she is also a Christian saint)
 Titus Flavius Clemens, consul, great-nephew of the Roman Emperor Vespasian, from traditional Roman religion (possibly to Jewish Christianity, as he is also a Christian saint)
 Fulvia, wife of Emperor Tiberius' close friend, Saturninus, from traditional Roman religion
 Onkelos, Hebrew scholar and translator, from ancient Roman religion

From Samaritanism 
Sofi Tsedaka, Israeli actress, singer, television presenter and politician

From Shinto 
Setzuso Kotsuji, son of a Shinto priest, and a professor in Japan (converted from Shinto to Christianity and then from Christianity to Judaism)

From Hinduism 

 Sarah Avraham, women's world Thai-boxing champion

From Buddhism 

 Angela Warnick Buchdahl, converted to Reform Judaism at age 21. She was not raised within the Buddhist faith, however; her mother is Buddhist, so by Orthodox Jewish law she was not considered Jewish, but she was raised Jewish and so by Reform Jewish law she has always been Jewish.

List of conversions named in the Bible 
 Bithiah, from traditional Egyptian religion
 Darius the Mede, from a mideastern religion who admitted that God of Israel is eternal Forever 
 Jethro, priest of Midian and father-in-law of Moses, from a Mideastern religion
 Makeda, queen of Sheba, from a Mideastern or Ethiopian religion
 Osenath, from the ancient Egyptian religion (her name relates to Anat)
 Ruth, great-grandmother of King David, from a Near Eastern religion
 Yael, from Canaanite or another Near Eastern religion
 Zipporah, from a Mideastern or northern African religion

Undetermined former religion 
 Joseph Bánóczi
 Drew Bundini Brown, assistant trainer of former heavyweight boxing champion Muhammad Ali
 Sarah Brown, actress
 Salem Shaloam David
 József Eisenhoffer
 Nachman Fahrner
 Lenny Kuhr, Dutch singer-songwriter
 Martha Nussbaum, American philosopher and academic
 Annamie Paul, Canadian activist, lawyer, and now recently the new federal Green Party leader since 2020.
 Helen Reddy, Australian American singer and actress
 Dara Torres
 Desmond Wilcox
 Andre Williams

Converts who later left the faith 

 Cristian Castro, Grammy Award-nominated Mexican pop singer (reverted to Roman Catholicism after divorcing his Jewish wife) 
 Bob Denard, French soldier and mercenary. Converted from Catholicism to Judaism, then from Judaism to Islam, then from Islam to Catholicism
Polemon II, king of Cilicia, converted to marry the Jewish princess Berenice; later relapsed

See also 
 List of people by belief
 List of Jews
 List of converts to Buddhism
 List of converts to Christianity
 List of people who converted to Catholicism
 List of converts to Hinduism
 List of converts to Islam
 List of converts to Sikhism

External links
 
 Did Modern Jews Originate in Italy?
 The origin of Eastern European Jews revealed by autosomal, sex chromosomal and mtDNA polymorphisms
 Surprise: Ashkenazi Jews Are Genetically European
 Genetic Roots of the Ashkenazi Jews
 Gideon Levy Took a DNA Test and Found Out the Truth About His Ancestors' Link to Israel

References

Bibliography 

 
 

 
Converts to Judaism
J